Cytochrome c oxidase subunit VIa polypeptide 2 is a protein that in humans is encoded by the COX6A2 gene. Cytochrome c oxidase 6A2 is a subunit of the cytochrome c oxidase complex, also known as Complex IV, the last enzyme in the mitochondrial electron transport chain.

Structure

The COX6A2 gene, located on the p arm of chromosome 16 in position 11.12, contains 3 exons and is 698 base pairs in length. The COX6A1 protein weighs 11 kDa and is composed of 97 amino acids. The protein is a subunit of Complex IV, a heteromeric complex consisting of 3 catalytic subunits encoded by mitochondrial genes and multiple structural subunits encoded by nuclear genes. This nuclear gene encodes polypeptide 2 (heart/muscle isoform) of subunit VIa, and polypeptide 2 is present only in striated muscles. Polypeptide 1 (liver isoform) of subunit VIa is encoded by a different gene, COX6A1, and is found in all non-muscle tissues. These two polypeptides share 66% amino acid sequence identity.

Function

Cytochrome c oxidase (COX) is the terminal enzyme of the mitochondrial respiratory chain. It is a multi-subunit enzyme complex that couples the transfer of electrons from cytochrome c to molecular oxygen and contributes to a proton electrochemical gradient across the inner mitochondrial membrane to drive ATP synthesis via protonmotive force.  The mitochondrially-encoded subunits perform the electron transfer of proton pumping activities. The functions of the nuclear-encoded subunits are unknown but they may play a role in the regulation and assembly of the complex.

Summary reaction:
 4 Fe2+-cytochrome c + 8 H+in + O2 → 4 Fe3+-cytochrome c + 2 H2O + 4 H+out

Clinical significance
The Trans-activator of transcription protein (Tat) of human immunodeficiency virus (HIV) inhibits cytochrome c oxidase (COX) activity in permeabilized mitochondria isolated from both mouse and human liver, heart, and brain samples. Rapid loss of membrane potential (ΔΨm) occurs with submicromolar doses of Tat, and cytochrome c is released from the mitochondria.

References

Further reading

External links 
 
Mass spectrometry characterization of COX6A2 at COPaKB